Richard Laurence O'Shea (31 January 1909 – 10 October 1998) was an Australian rules footballer who played with North Melbourne and Essendon in the Victorian Football League (VFL).

O'Shea played with Victorian Football Association (VFA) clubs Camberwell in 1934 and Northcote from 1935 to 1937 and then Fairfield from 1938 to 1940.

O'Shea also later served in the Australian Army during World War II.

Notes

External links 

1909 births
1998 deaths
Australian rules footballers from Victoria (Australia)
North Melbourne Football Club players
Essendon Football Club players
Camberwell Football Club players
Northcote Football Club players